The 12077 / 12078 Chennai–Vijayawada Jan Shatabdi is a day-train, so called because as it returns to the station of origin on the same day. It connects the two commercial centers of South India – Chennai and Vijayawada. It is one of the fastest and most comfortable trains between Chennai and Vijayawada.

Overview

The train is numbered as 12077 from Chennai Central. It departs at 07:35 and reaches Vijayawada Junction at 14:45 taking 7 hours 10 minutes to cover  455 km. On the return journey the train is numbered as 12078 and departs from Vijayawada Jn at 15:20 and arrives at Chennai Central at 22:30.

The Chennai–Vijayawada Jan Shatabdi is an 11-coach train and has 8 Jan Shatabdi class chair cars, 1 AC chair car and 2 luggage-cum-brake vans as part of its seating configuration.

History

It was allocated with the modern LHB coach from February 2020.

Route & halts
 
 
 Nayudupeta (Naidupeta)

Locomotives
It is hauled by a Royapuram or Erode-based WAP-7 locomotive on its entire journey.

See also
Mayiladuthurai–Coimbatore Jan Shatabdi Express
Bangalore City–Hubli Jan Shatabdi Express

References

Transport in Chennai
Transport in Vijayawada
Jan Shatabdi Express trains
Rail transport in Tamil Nadu
Rail transport in Andhra Pradesh